Clintondale is an unincorporated community and census-designated place (CDP) in Clinton County, Pennsylvania, United States. It was first listed as a CDP prior to the 2020 census.

The CDP is in southern Clinton County, in the west-central part of Porter Township. It is bordered to the southwest by Fishing Creek, across which is the CDP of Lamar. Fishing Creek is a northeast-flowing tributary of Bald Eagle Creek, part of the West Branch Susquehanna River watershed.

Pennsylvania Route 64 forms the northwest boundary of Clintondale; it leads northeast  to Mill Hall and southwest  to State College. Interstate 80 passes just north of Clintondale, with access from Exit 173 (PA 64). I-80 leads east  to the Milton area and west  to Clearfield.

Clintondale is in the northeast part of the Nittany Valley, with  Big Mountain rising  to the south and  Bald Eagle Mountain  to the north.

Demographics

References 

Census-designated places in Clinton County, Pennsylvania
Census-designated places in Pennsylvania